Three locations in the United States were used as landing sites for the Space Shuttle system. Each site included runways of sufficient length for the slowing-down of a returning spacecraft. The prime landing site was the Shuttle Landing Facility at the Kennedy Space Center in Florida, a purpose-built landing strip. Landings also occurred at Edwards Air Force Base in California, and one took place at White Sands Space Harbor in New Mexico. No Space Shuttle landed on a dry lakebed runway after 1991.

Various international landing sites were also available in the event of a Transoceanic Abort Landing (TAL) scenario, as well as other sites in the United States and Canada in case of an East Coast Abort Landing (ECAL) situation. Space Shuttle landings were intended to regularly take place at Vandenberg Air Force Base in California for Department of Defense missions launched from the site, but none occurred due to the cancellation of all launches from Vandenberg.

Kennedy Space Center 

The Shuttle Landing Facility at the Kennedy Space Center in Florida has a single  concrete runway, 15/33. It is designated Runway 15 or 33, depending on the direction of use. The first landing at the SLF was for mission STS-41B in 1984; landings were suspended at the site following brake damage and a blown tire during the STS-51D landing in 1985, and resumed in 1990. Thirty-six missions landed on Runway 15 and forty-two missions landed on Runway 33, accumulating a total of 78 missions.

Edwards Air Force Base 

Edwards Air Force Base in California was the site of the first Space Shuttle landing, and became a back-up site to the prime landing location, the Shuttle Landing Facility at the Kennedy Space Center. Several runways are arrayed on the dry lakebed at Rogers Dry Lake, and there are also concrete runways. Space shuttle landings on the lake bed took place on Runways 05/23, 15/33 and 17/35. Of the concrete strips, the main Runway 04/22 was utilized. During the renovation of 04/22, a temporary runway (with the same designation) was constructed parallel to it and used for one landing (STS-126). Five ALT free flights and 54 operational Space Shuttle missions landed on Edwards Air Force Base runways, making a total of fifty-nine.

White Sands 

White Sands Space Harbor at White Sands Test Facility in New Mexico was an emergency landing site for the Space Shuttle and was used as a backup when the runways at Edwards Air Force Base and the Kennedy Space Center were unavailable.  Two  runways and a  runway were available for landings on the dry lake bed. One mission, STS-3, used Runway 17 for a landing due to flooding at its originally planned landing site, Edwards Air Force Base.

Transoceanic Abort Landing Sites 
In the event of an abort during launch, NASA had several international locations designated as Transoceanic Abort Landing (TAL) sites. The sites included Naval Air Station Bermuda,  Lajes Air Base in Terceira island, Azores, Portugal, Zaragoza Air Base in Spain, Morón Air Base in Spain, and Istres Air Base in France. All sites have runways of sufficient length to support the landing of a Space Shuttle, and included personnel from NASA as well as equipment to aid a space shuttle landing. Former TAL sites include Diego Garcia in the British Indian Ocean Territory; Cologne Bonn Airport in Germany; Ben Guerir Air Base, Morocco (1988–2002); Casablanca, Morocco (up to 1986); Banjul International Airport, The Gambia (1987–2002); Dakar, Senegal; Rota, Spain; and Kano, Nigeria. Had a TAL situation arisen during a launch from Vandenberg Air Force Base, Hao and Easter Islands in the Pacific Ocean would have been the TAL sites.

RAF Fairford was the only Transoceanic Abort Landing site for NASA's Space Shuttle in the UK. As well as having a sufficiently long runway for a Shuttle landing (the runway is 3 km long), Fairford also had NASA-trained fire and medical crews stationed on the base.

East Coast Abort Landing Sites 
In certain launch abort situations where the mission profile supports a trajectory for such a landing, runways on the East Coast of the United States and Canada could have been used for an East Coast Abort Landing (ECAL) situation.  The following sites could have been used for an ECAL: Miami International Airport, Miami, Florida; Plattsburgh International Airport, Plattsburgh, New York, Francis S. Gabreski Airport, Westhampton Beach, New York; Atlantic City International Airport, New Jersey; Myrtle Beach International Airport, Myrtle Beach, South Carolina; Wilmington International Airport, North Carolina Marine Corps Air Station Cherry Point, North Carolina; Naval Air Station Oceana, Virginia; Dover Air Force Base, Delaware; Bangor International Airport, Maine; Westover Air Reserve Base, Massachusetts; Bradley International Airport, Connecticut; Otis Air National Guard Base, Massachusetts; Pease Air National Guard Base, Portsmouth, New Hampshire; Halifax Stanfield International Airport, Enfield, Nova Scotia; Stephenville International Airport, Stephenville, Newfoundland; CFB Goose Bay, Labrador; Gander International Airport, Gander, Newfoundland, St. John's International Airport, St. Johns, Newfoundland;
Loring Air Force Base, Limestone, Maine. Griffiss International Airport Rome, NY U.S.A.

Vandenberg Air Force Base 
Space Shuttle missions to be launched from Vandenberg Air Force Base in California were planned to conclude with a landing at Runway 12/30 at the site. The runway was lengthened to support shuttle landings. The first landing at Vandenberg was planned for mission STS-62-A, which was scheduled for launch in July 1986, but canceled in the wake of the STS-51-L accident. No space shuttle operations or landings ever occurred at the site.

Other sites
The joint use civilian/military Lincoln Airport/Lincoln Air National Guard Base in Lincoln, Nebraska, USA was designated as an alternate landing site for its 12,900 ft (3,932 m) long main runway.  Including 1000 ft over-runs on each end, the runway totaled almost 15,000 ft in length. The site also had low air traffic, both commercial and military. No space shuttle landing ever occurred there.

Amílcar Cabral International Airport on the island of Sal, Cape Verde, was another designated emergency landing site. Runway 01/19 at Amílcar Cabral International Airport is 10,735 ft long and is paved. No Space Shuttle landing occurred here either.
Also Gran Canaria Airport was used as a back-up site.

See also
 Space Shuttle emergency landing sites

References

External links
Shuttle Landing Facility 
Edwards Air Force Base
NASA – White Sands Space Harbor
Space Shuttle Worldwide Landing Sites

Landing Sites
Kennedy Space Center
Shuttle landing sites